The Emblem of Bougainville is an official symbol of the Autonomous Region of Bougainville in Papua New Guinea.

The emblem depicts a traditional garamut drum, drum sticks and an upe head dress. It was initially adopted in 1978 for the then province of North Solomons and continued to remain in use, with a modified legend, when the Autonomous Region of Bougainville was created in 2002.

See also

Emblem of Papua New Guinea

References

Autonomous Region of Bougainville
1978 introductions